Eyal Stigman (איל שטיגמן; also "Shtigman"; born June 9, 1963) is an Israeli former Olympic swimmer. When he competed in the Olympics, he was 5-8.5 (175 cm) tall and weighed 163 lbs (74 kg).

Swimming career
Stigman competed for Israel at the 1984 Summer Olympics in Los Angeles, at the age of 21, in Swimming--Men's 100 metre Breaststroke, and came in 22nd with a time of 1:05.63.  He also competed in the Men's 200 metre Breaststroke, and came in 23rd with a time of 2:24.93.

Swimming for Israel at the 1985 Maccabiah Games, Stigman won the gold medal and set a Maccabiah Games and Israeli record in the 100 meter breaststroke.

Stigman competed for Israel at the 1988 Summer Olympics in Seoul, at the age of 25, in Swimming--Men's 100 metre Breaststroke, and came in 42nd with a time of 1:05.92.  He also competed in the Men's 200 metre Breaststroke, and came in 37th with at time of 2:25.18.

In 2007 Stigman set Israeli national swimming records for the 40-and-under age group, while swimming for Maccabi Rishon LeZion, in the 50 meter breaststroke with a time of 33.13, and in the 200 meter individual medley with a time of 2:32:07.

References

External links
 

Living people
1963 births
Olympic swimmers of Israel
Swimmers at the 1984 Summer Olympics
Swimmers at the 1988 Summer Olympics
Maccabiah Games medalists in swimming
Maccabiah Games gold medalists for Israel
Israeli male swimmers
Competitors at the 1985 Maccabiah Games
20th-century Israeli people